This is a list of members of the 13th Bundestag – the lower house of parliament of the Federal Republic of Germany, whose members were in office from 1994 until 1998.



Summary 
This summary includes changes in the numbers of the five caucuses (CDU/CSU, SPD, Greens, FDP, Party of Democratic Socialism):

Members

A 
 Ulrich Adam, CDU
 Brigitte Adler, SPD
 Ina Albowitz, FDP
 Peter Altmaier, CDU
 Elisabeth Altmann, Bündnis 90/Die Grünen
 Gila Altmann, Bündnis 90/Die Grünen
 Gerd Andres, SPD
 Robert Antretter, SPD
 Anneliese Augustin, CDU
 Jürgen Augustinowitz, CDU
 Dietrich Austermann, CDU

B 
 Gisela Babel, FDP
 Hermann Bachmaier, SPD
 Ernst Bahr, SPD
 Heinz-Günter Bargfrede, CDU
 Doris Barnett, SPD
 Klaus Barthel, SPD
 Franz Peter Basten, CDU
 Wolf Bauer, CDU
 Gerd Bauer, SPD
 Brigitte Baumeister, CDU
 Marieluise Beck, Bündnis 90/Die Grünen
 Volker Beck, Bündnis 90/Die Grünen
 Ingrid Becker-Inglau, SPD
 Angelika Beer, Bündnis 90/Die Grünen
 Wolfgang Behrendt, SPD
 Meinrad Belle, CDU
 Hans Berger, SPD
 Sabine Bergmann-Pohl, CDU
 Matthias Berninger, Bündnis 90/Die Grünen
 Hans Gottfried Bernrath, SPD
 Hans-Werner Bertl, SPD
 Friedhelm Julius Beucher, SPD
 Hans-Dirk Bierling, CDU
 Wolfgang Bierstedt, PDS
 Rudolf Bindig, SPD
 Joseph-Theodor Blank, CDU
 Renate Blank, CSU
 Petra Bläss, PDS
 Heribert Blens, CDU
 Peter Bleser, CDU
 Norbert Blüm, CDU
 Lieselott Blunck, SPD
 Friedrich Bohl, CDU
 Ulrich Böhme, SPD
 Maria Böhmer, CDU
 Jochen Borchert, CDU
 Wolfgang Börnsen, CDU
 Arne Börnsen, SPD
 Wolfgang Bosbach, CDU
 Wolfgang Bötsch, CSU
 Maritta Böttcher, PDS
 Klaus Brähmig, CDU
 Anni Brandt-Elsweier, SPD
 Rudolf Braun, CDU
 Hildebrecht Braun, FDP
 Tilo Braune, SPD
 Eberhard Brecht, SPD
 Günther Bredehorn, FDP
 Paul Breuer, CDU
 Monika Brudlewsky, CDU
 Georg Brunnhuber, CDU
 Klaus Bühler, CDU
 Eva Bulling-Schröter, PDS
 Edelgard Bulmahn, SPD
 Annelie Buntenbach, Bündnis 90/Die Grünen
 Ulla Burchardt, SPD
 Michael Bürsch, SPD
 Hans Martin Bury, SPD
 Hartmut Büttner, CDU
 Hans Büttner, SPD
 Dankward Buwitt, CDU

C 
 Manfred Carstens, CDU
 Peter Harry Carstensen, CDU
 Marion Caspers-Merk, SPD
 Wolf-Michael Catenhusen, SPD
 Peter Conradi, SPD

D 
 Herta Däubler-Gmelin, SPD
 Wolfgang Dehnel, CDU
 Christel Deichmann, SPD
 Hubert Deittert, CDU
 Gertrud Dempwolf, CDU
 Albert Deß, CSU
 Renate Diemers, CDU
 Amke Dietert-Scheuer, Bündnis 90/Die Grünen
 Wilhelm Dietzel, CDU
 Karl Diller, SPD
 Marliese Dobberthien, SPD
 Werner Dörflinger, CDU
 Hansjürgen Doss, CDU
 Alfred Dregger, CDU
 Peter Dreßen, SPD
 Rudolf Dreßler, SPD
 Freimut Duve, SPD

E 
 Ludwig Eich, SPD
 Maria Eichhorn, CSU
 Franziska Eichstädt-Bohlig, Bündnis 90/Die Grünen
 Uschi Eid, Bündnis 90/Die Grünen
 Heinrich Graf von Einsiedel, PDS
 Ludwig Elm, PDS
 Peter Enders, SPD
 Wolfgang Engelmann, CDU
 Dagmar Enkelmann, PDS
 Rainer Eppelmann, CDU
 Gernot Erler, SPD
 Petra Ernstberger, SPD
 Jörg van Essen, FDP
 Heinz Dieter Eßmann, CDU
 Horst Eylmann, CDU
 Anke Eymer, CDU

F 
 Ilse Falk, CDU
 Kurt Faltlhauser, CSU
 Annette Faße, SPD
 Jochen Feilcke, CDU
 Olaf Feldmann, FDP
 Karl H. Fell, CDU
 Elke Ferner, SPD
 Ulf Fink, CDU
 Andrea Fischer, Bündnis 90/Die Grünen
 Joschka Fischer, Bündnis 90/Die Grünen
 Dirk Fischer, CDU
 Leni Fischer, CDU
 Lothar Fischer, SPD
 Gabriele Fograscher, SPD
 Iris Follak, SPD
 Eva Folta, SPD
 Norbert Formanski, SPD
 Klaus Francke, CDU
 Herbert Frankenhauser, CSU
 Dagmar Freitag, SPD
 Gisela Frick, FDP
 Paul Friedhoff, FDP
 Gerhard Friedrich, CSU
 Horst Friedrich, FDP
 Erich G. Fritz, CDU
 Ruth Fuchs, PDS
 Anke Fuchs, SPD
 Katrin Fuchs, SPD
 Hans-Joachim Fuchtel, CDU
 Arne Fuhrmann, SPD
 Rainer Funke, FDP

G 
 Monika Ganseforth, SPD
 Norbert Gansel, SPD
 Michaela Geiger, CSU
 Norbert Geis, CSU
 Heiner Geißler, CDU
 Hans-Dietrich Genscher, FDP
 Wolfgang Gerhardt, FDP
 Konrad Gilges, SPD
 Iris Gleicke, SPD
 Michael Glos, CSU
 Günter Gloser, SPD
 Peter Glotz, SPD
 Wilma Glücklich, CDU
 Reinhard Göhner, CDU
 Uwe Göllner, SPD
 Peter Götz, CDU
 Wolfgang Götzer, CSU
 Angelika Graf, SPD
 Günter Graf, SPD
 Dieter Grasedieck, SPD
 Joachim Gres, CDU
 Rita Grießhaber, Bündnis 90/Die Grünen
 Kurt-Dieter Grill, CDU
 Wolfgang Gröbl, CSU
 Hermann Gröhe, CDU
 Achim Großmann, SPD
 Claus-Peter Grotz, CDU
 Manfred Grund, CDU
 Horst Günther, CDU
 Joachim Günther, FDP
 Karlheinz Guttmacher, FDP
 Gregor Gysi, PDS

H 
 Karl Hermann Haack, SPD
 Hans-Joachim Hacker, SPD
 Gerald Häfner, Bündnis 90/Die Grünen
 Klaus Hagemann, SPD
 Carl-Detlev Freiherr von Hammerstein, CDU
 Manfred Hampel, SPD
 Christel Hanewinckel, SPD
 Alfred Hartenbach, SPD
 Liesel Hartenstein, SPD
 Hanns-Peter Hartmann, PDS
 Gottfried Haschke, CDU
 Klaus Hasenfratz, SPD
 Gerda Hasselfeldt, CSU
 Ingomar Hauchler, SPD
 Rainer Haungs, CDU
 Otto Hauser, CDU
 Hansgeorg Hauser, CSU
 Helmut Haussmann, FDP
 Klaus-Jürgen Hedrich, CDU
 Helmut Heiderich, CDU
 Ulrich Heinrich, FDP
 Jens Heinzig, SPD
 Manfred Heise, CDU
 Dieter Heistermann, SPD
 Detlef Helling, CDU
 Renate Hellwig, CDU
 Reinhold Hemker, SPD
 Rolf Hempelmann, SPD
 Barbara Hendricks, SPD
 Antje Hermenau, Bündnis 90/Die Grünen
 Monika Heubaum, SPD
 Uwe-Jens Heuer, PDS
 Stefan Heym, PDS
 Kristin Heyne, Bündnis 90/Die Grünen
 Uwe Hiksch, SPD
 Reinhold Hiller, SPD
 Stephan Hilsberg, SPD
 Ernst Hinsken, CSU
 Peter Hintze, CDU
 Walter Hirche, FDP
 Burkhard Hirsch, FDP
 Gerd Höfer, SPD
 Jelena Hoffmann, SPD
 Ulrike Höfken, Bündnis 90/Die Grünen
 Frank Hofmann, SPD
 Barbara Höll, PDS
 Josef Hollerith, CSU
 Elke Holzapfel, CDU
 Ingrid Holzhüter, SPD
 Birgit Homburger, FDP
 Erwin Horn, SPD
 Karl-Heinz Hornhues, CDU
 Siegfried Hornung, CDU
 Heinz-Adolf Hörsken, CDU
 Joachim Hörster, CDU
 Eike Hovermann, SPD
 Werner Hoyer, FDP
 Hubert Hüppe, CDU
 Michaele Hustedt, Bündnis 90/Die Grünen

I 
 Lothar Ibrügger, SPD
 Wolfgang Ilte, SPD
 Barbara Imhof, SPD
 Brunhilde Irber, SPD
 Ulrich Irmer, FDP
 Gabriele Iwersen, SPD

J 
 Willibald Jacob, PDS
 Peter Jacoby, CDU
 Susanne Jaffke, CDU
 Renate Jäger, SPD
 Georg Janovsky, CDU
 Jann-Peter Janssen, SPD
 Ilse Janz, SPD
 Helmut Jawurek, CSU
 Ulla Jelpke, PDS
 Uwe Jens, SPD
 Dionys Jobst, CSU
 Rainer Jork, CDU
 , CDU
 Volker Jung, SPD
 Ulrich Junghanns, CDU
 Gerhard Jüttemann, PDS
 Egon Jüttner, CDU

K 
 Harald Kahl, CDU
 Bartholomäus Kalb, CSU
 Steffen Kampeter, CDU
 Dietmar Kansy, CDU
 Manfred Kanther, CDU
 Irmgard Karwatzki, CDU
 Sabine Kaspereit, SPD
 Susanne Kastner, SPD
 Ernst Kastning, SPD
 Volker Kauder, CDU
 , CSU
 Hans-Peter Kemper, SPD
 Klaus Kinkel, FDP
 Manuel Kiper, Bündnis 90/Die Grünen
 Klaus Kirschner, SPD
 Eckart von Klaeden, CDU
 Marianne Klappert, SPD
 Bernd Klaußner, CDU
 Hans Klein, CSU
 Detlef Kleinert, FDP
 Siegrun Klemmer, SPD
 Ulrich Klinkert, CDU
 Hans-Ulrich Klose, SPD
 Hans-Hinrich Knaape, SPD
 Heidi Knake-Werner, PDS
 Monika Knoche, Bündnis 90/Die Grünen
 Helmut Kohl, CDU
 Hans-Ulrich Köhler, CDU
 Roland Kohn, FDP
 Rolf Köhne, PDS
 Heinrich Leonhard Kolb, FDP
 Manfred Kolbe, CDU
 Walter Kolbow, SPD
 Norbert Königshofen, CDU
 Jürgen Koppelin, FDP
 Fritz Rudolf Körper, SPD
 Eva-Maria Kors, CDU
 Hartmut Koschyk, CSU
 Manfred Koslowski, CDU
 Thomas Kossendey, CDU
 Angelika Köster-Loßack, Bündnis 90/Die Grünen
 Annegret Kramp-Karrenbauer, CDU
 Rudolf Kraus, CSU
 Wolfgang Krause, CDU
 Andreas Krautscheid, CDU
 Nicolette Kressl, SPD
 Arnulf Kriedner, CDU
 Heinz-Jürgen Kronberg, CDU
 Volker Kröning, SPD
 , CDU
 Thomas Krüger, SPD
 Reiner Krziskewitz, CDU
 Horst Kubatschka, SPD
 Hermann Kues, CDU
 Eckart Kuhlwein, SPD
 Werner Kuhn, CDU
 Helga Kühn-Mengel, SPD
 Konrad Kunick, SPD
 Christine Kurzhals, SPD
 Uwe Küster, SPD
 Rolf Kutzmutz, PDS

L 
 Werner Labsch, SPD
 Karl-Hans Laermann, FDP
 Oskar Lafontaine, SPD
 Otto Graf Lambsdorff, FDP
 Karl A. Lamers, CDU
 Karl Lamers, CDU
 Norbert Lammert, CDU
 Helmut Lamp, CDU
 Heinz Lanfermann, FDP
 Brigitte Lange, SPD
 Detlev von Larcher, SPD
 Armin Laschet, CDU
 Herbert Lattmann, CDU
 Paul Laufs, CDU
 Karl-Josef Laumann, CDU
 Andrea Lederer, PDS
 Waltraud Lehn, SPD
 Robert Leidinger, SPD
 Steffi Lemke, Bündnis 90/Die Grünen
 Vera Lengsfeld, Bündnis 90/Die Grünen
 Klaus Lennartz, SPD
 Werner Lensing, CDU
 Christian Lenzer, CDU
 Elke Leonhard, SPD
 Peter Letzgus, CDU
 Sabine Leutheusser-Schnarrenberger, FDP
 Editha Limbach, CDU
 Walter Link, CDU
 Eduard Lintner, CSU
 Helmut Lippelt, Bündnis 90/Die Grünen
 Klaus Lippold, CDU
 Manfred Lischewski, CDU
 Wolfgang Lohmann, CDU
 Klaus Lohmann, SPD
 Christa Lörcher, SPD
 Erika Lotz, SPD
 Julius Louven, CDU
 Sigrun Löwisch, CDU
 Christine Lucyga, SPD
 Christa Luft, PDS
 Uwe Lühr, FDP
 Heinrich Lummer, CDU
 Heidemarie Lüth, PDS
 Michael Luther, CDU

M 
 Erich Maaß, CDU
 Dieter Maaß, SPD
 Dietrich Mahlo, CDU
 Günther Maleuda, PDS
 Winfried Mante, SPD
 Claire Marienfeld, CDU
 Erwin Marschewski, CDU
 Günter Marten, CDU
 Dorothea Marx, SPD
 Ulrike Mascher, SPD
 Christoph Matschie, SPD
 Ingrid Matthäus-Maier, SPD
 Heide Mattischeck, SPD
 Martin Mayer, CSU
 Markus Meckel, SPD
 Wolfgang Meckelburg, CDU
 Ulrike Mehl, SPD
 Rudolf Meinl, CDU
 Herbert Meißner, SPD
 Michael Meister, CDU
 Angela Merkel, CDU
 Angelika Mertens, SPD
 Friedrich Merz, CDU
 Oswald Metzger, Bündnis 90/Die Grünen
 Rudolf Meyer, CDU
 Jürgen Meyer, SPD
 Hans Michelbach, CSU
 Meinolf Michels, CDU
 Ursula Mogg, SPD
 Jürgen Möllemann, FDP
 Siegmar Mosdorf, SPD
 Kerstin Müller, Bündnis 90/Die Grünen
 Elmar Müller, CDU
 Gerd Müller, CSU
 , PDS
 , SPD
 Jutta Müller, SPD
 Michael Müller, SPD

N 
 Winfried Nachtwei, Bündnis 90/Die Grünen
 Engelbert Nelle, CDU
 Rosel Neuhäuser, PDS
 Bernd Neumann, CDU
 Gerhard Neumann, SPD
 , SPD
 Volker Neumann, SPD
 Christa Nickels, Bündnis 90/Die Grünen
 Edith Niehuis, SPD
 Rolf Niese, SPD
 Egbert Nitsch, Bündnis 90/Die Grünen
 Johannes Nitsch, CDU
 Claudia Nolte, CDU
 Günther Friedrich Nolting, FDP

O 
 Doris Odendahl, SPD
 Günter Oesinghaus, SPD
 Rolf Olderog, CDU
 Leyla Onur, SPD
 Manfred Opel, SPD
 Rainer Ortleb, FDP
 Friedhelm Ost, CDU
 Adolf Ostertag, SPD
 Eduard Oswald, CSU
 Norbert Otto, CDU
 Cem Özdemir, Bündnis 90/Die Grünen

P 
 Kurt Palis, SPD
 Albrecht Papenroth, SPD
 Gerhard Päselt, CDU
 Peter Paziorek, CDU
 Willfried Penner, SPD
 Hans-Wilhelm Pesch, CDU
 Lisa Peters, FDP
 Ulrich Petzold, CDU
 Martin Pfaff, SPD
 Georg Pfannenstein, SPD
 Anton Pfeifer, CDU
 Angelika Pfeiffer, CDU
 Gero Pfennig, CDU
 Friedbert Pflüger, CDU
 Beatrix Philipp, CDU
 Eckhart Pick, SPD
 Winfried Pinger, CDU
 Ronald Pofalla, CDU
 Hermann Pohler, CDU
 Ruprecht Polenz, CDU
 Gerd Poppe, Bündnis 90/Die Grünen
 Joachim Poß, SPD
 Marlies Pretzlaff, CDU
 Simone Probst, Bündnis 90/Die Grünen
 Albert Probst, CSU
 Bernd Protzner, CSU
 Rudolf Purps, SPD
 Dieter Pützhofen, CDU

R 
 Thomas Rachel, CDU
 Hans Raidel, CSU
 Peter Ramsauer, CSU
 Hermann Rappe, SPD
 Rolf Rau, CDU
 Helmut Rauber, CDU
 Peter Rauen, CDU
 Otto Regenspurger, CSU
 Karin Rehbock-Zureich, SPD
 Christa Reichard, CDU
 Klaus Dieter Reichardt, CDU
 Bertold Mathias Reinartz, CDU
 Erika Reinhardt, CDU
 Margot von Renesse, SPD
 Renate Rennebach, SPD
 Hans-Peter Repnik, CDU
 Otto Reschke, SPD
 Bernd Reuter, SPD
 Günter Rexrodt, FDP
 Roland Richter, CDU
 Edelbert Richter, SPD
 Roland Richwien, CDU
 Norbert Rieder, CDU
 Erich Riedl, CSU
 Klaus Riegert, CDU
 Heinz Riesenhuber, CDU
 Günter Rixe, SPD
 Reinhold Robbe, SPD
 Jürgen Rochlitz, Bündnis 90/Die Grünen
 Klaus Röhl, FDP
 Franz Romer, CDU
 Hannelore Rönsch, CDU
 Heinrich-Wilhelm Ronsöhr, CDU
 Klaus Rose, CSU
 Uwe-Jens Rössel, PDS
 Kurt Rossmanith, CSU
 Adolf Roth, CDU
 Norbert Röttgen, CDU
 Gerhard Rübenkönig, SPD
 Christian Ruck, CSU
 Volker Rühe, CDU
 Marlene Rupprecht, SPD
 Jürgen Rüttgers, CDU

S 
 Halo Saibold, Bündnis 90/Die Grünen
 Roland Sauer, CDU
 Helmut Schäfer, FDP
 Hansjörg Schäfer, SPD
 Gudrun Schaich-Walch, SPD
 Dieter Schanz, SPD
 Rudolf Scharping, SPD
 Ortrun Schätzle, CDU
 Wolfgang Schäuble, CDU
 Hartmut Schauerte, CDU
 Christine Scheel, Bündnis 90/Die Grünen
 Bernd Scheelen, SPD
 Hermann Scheer, SPD
 Siegfried Scheffler, SPD
 Heinz Schemken, CDU
 Christina Schenk, PDS
 Karl-Heinz Scherhag, CDU
 Gerhard Scheu, CSU
 Irmingard Schewe-Gerigk, Bündnis 90/Die Grünen
 Horst Schild, SPD
 Otto Schily, SPD
 Norbert Schindler, CDU
 Rezzo Schlauch, Bündnis 90/Die Grünen
 Dietmar Schlee, CDU
 Dieter Schloten, SPD
 Günter Schluckebier, SPD
 Ulrich Schmalz, CDU
 Cornelia Schmalz-Jacobsen, FDP
 Bernd Schmidbauer, CDU
 Horst Schmidbauer, SPD
 , Bündnis 90/Die Grünen
 , CDU
 Joachim Schmidt, CDU
 Christian Schmidt, CSU
 Dagmar Schmidt, SPD
 Ulla Schmidt, SPD
 , SPD
 Edzard Schmidt-Jortzig, FDP
 Regina Schmidt-Zadel, SPD
 Hans-Otto Schmiedeberg, CDU
 Wolfgang Schmitt, Bündnis 90/Die Grünen
 Heinz Schmitt, SPD
 Hans Peter Schmitz, CDU
 Michael von Schmude, CDU
 Emil Schnell, SPD
 Birgit Schnieber-Jastram, CDU
 Andreas Schockenhoff, CDU
 Walter Schöler, SPD
 Rupert Scholz, CDU
 Ursula Schönberger, Bündnis 90/Die Grünen
 Waltraud Schoppe, Bündnis 90/Die Grünen
 Reinhard von Schorlemer, CDU
 Ottmar Schreiner, SPD
 Gisela Schröter, SPD
 Mathias Schubert, SPD
 Erika Schuchardt, CDU
 Richard Schuhmann, SPD
 Wolfgang Schulhoff, CDU
 Dieter Schulte, CDU
 Brigitte Schulte, SPD
 Reinhard Schultz, SPD
 Volkmar Schultz, SPD
 Werner Schulz, Bündnis 90/Die Grünen
 Gerhard Schulz, CDU
 Frederick Schulze, CDU
 Ilse Schumann, SPD
 Werner Schuster, SPD
 Dietmar Schütz, SPD
 Diethard Schütze, CDU
 Irmgard Schwaetzer, FDP
 Clemens Schwalbe, CDU
 Angelica Schwall-Düren, SPD
 Ernst Schwanhold, SPD
 Rolf Schwanitz, SPD
 Christian Schwarz-Schilling, CDU
 Wilhelm Josef Sebastian, CDU
 Horst Seehofer, CSU
 Marion Seib, CSU
 Wilfried Seibel, CDU
 Bodo Seidenthal, SPD
 Heinz Seiffert, CDU
 Rudolf Seiters, CDU
 Johannes Selle, CDU
 Lisa Seuster, SPD
 Bernd Siebert, CDU
 Horst Sielaff, SPD
 Jürgen Sikora, CDU
 Erika Simm, SPD
 Johannes Singer, SPD
 Johannes Singhammer, CSU
 Sigrid Skarpelis-Sperk, SPD
 Hermann Otto Solms, FDP
 Cornelie Sonntag-Wolgast, SPD
 Wieland Sorge, SPD
 Bärbel Sothmann, CDU
 Wolfgang Spanier, SPD
 Margarete Späte, CDU
 Dietrich Sperling, SPD
 Jörg-Otto Spiller, SPD
 Carl-Dieter Spranger, CSU
 Max Stadler, FDP
 Antje-Marie Steen, SPD
 Rainder Steenblock, Bündnis 90/Die Grünen
 Wolfgang Steiger, CDU
 Erika Steinbach, CDU
 Marina Steindor, Bündnis 90/Die Grünen
 Christian Sterzing, Bündnis 90/Die Grünen
 Wolfgang von Stetten, CDU
 Ludwig Stiegler, SPD
 Gerhard Stoltenberg, CDU
 Andreas Storm, CDU
 Max Straubinger, CSU
 Matthäus Strebl, CSU
 Peter Struck, SPD
 Michael Stübgen, CDU
 Manfred Such, Bündnis 90/Die Grünen
 Egon Susset, CDU
 Rita Süssmuth, CDU

T 
 Joachim Tappe, SPD
 Jörg Tauss, SPD
 Bodo Teichmann, SPD
 Michael Teiser, CDU
 Margitta Terborg, SPD
 Jella Teuchner, SPD
 Gerald Thalheim, SPD
 Carl-Ludwig Thiele, FDP
 Wolfgang Thierse, SPD
 Dietmar Thieser, SPD
 Dieter Thomae, FDP
 Franz Thönnes, SPD
 Susanne Tiemann, CDU
 Steffen Tippach, PDS
 Uta Titze-Stecher, SPD
 Klaus Töpfer, CDU
 Gottfried Tröger, CDU
 Adelheid D. Tröscher, SPD
 Jürgen Türk, FDP

U 
 Klaus-Dieter Uelhoff, CDU
 Gunnar Uldall, CDU
 Hans-Eberhard Urbaniak, SPD

V 
 Siegfried Vergin, SPD
 Günter Verheugen, SPD
 Wolfgang Vogt, CDU
 Ute Vogt, SPD
 Karsten Voigt, SPD
 Antje Vollmer, Bündnis 90/Die Grünen
 Ludger Volmer, Bündnis 90/Die Grünen
 Josef Vosen, SPD

W 
 Horst Waffenschmidt, CDU
 Hans-Georg Wagner, SPD
 Theodor Waigel, CSU
 Alois Graf von Waldburg-Zeil, CDU
 Hans Wallow, SPD
 Klaus-Jürgen Warnick, PDS
 Jürgen Warnke, CSU
 Konstanze Wegner, SPD
 Wolfgang Weiermann, SPD
 Reinhard Weis, SPD
 Matthias Weisheit, SPD
 Gunter Weißgerber, SPD
 Gert Weisskirchen, SPD
 Jochen Welt, SPD
 Wolfgang Weng, FDP
 Hildegard Wester, SPD
 Guido Westerwelle, FDP
 Lydia Westrich, SPD
 Inge Wettig-Danielmeier, SPD
 Kersten Wetzel, CDU
 Helmut Wieczorek, SPD
 Norbert Wieczorek, SPD
 Heidemarie Wieczorek-Zeul, SPD
 Dieter Wiefelspütz, SPD
 Helmut Wilhelm, Bündnis 90/Die Grünen
 Hans-Otto Wilhelm, CDU
 Gert Willner, CDU
 Bernd Wilz, CDU
 Willy Wimmer, CDU
 Matthias Wissmann, CDU
 Berthold Wittich, SPD
 Fritz Wittmann, CSU
 Simon Wittmann, CSU
 Wolfgang Wodarg, SPD
 Verena Wohlleben, SPD
 Dagmar Wöhrl, CSU
 Margareta Wolf, Bündnis 90/Die Grünen
 Winfried Wolf, PDS
 Hanna Wolf, SPD
 Michael Wonneberger, CDU
 Heidemarie Wright, SPD
 Elke Wülfing, CDU
 Peter Kurt Würzbach, CDU

Y 
 Cornelia Yzer, CDU

Z 
 Uta Zapf, SPD
 Wolfgang Zeitlmann, CSU
 Benno Zierer, CSU
 Wolfgang Zöller, CSU
 Christoph Zöpel, SPD
 Peter Zumkley, SPD
 Gerhard Zwerenz, PDS

See also 
 Politics of Germany
 List of Bundestag Members

13